Chun Joo-weon (born 15 November 1972) is a South Korean women's basketball coach and former player.

Career
Chun graduated from Sunil Girls' High School (선일여자고등학교) in 1991, and thereafter joined the Hyundai Electronics women's basketball team. She competed in the 1996 Summer Olympics and in the 2000 Summer Olympics. As of 2013, she is a coach for the Chuncheon Woori Bank team in the Women's Korean Basketball League.

References

External links
 

1972 births
Living people
South Korean women's basketball players
Olympic basketball players of South Korea
Basketball players at the 1996 Summer Olympics
Basketball players at the 2000 Summer Olympics
Asian Games medalists in basketball
Basketball players at the 1994 Asian Games
Basketball players at the 1998 Asian Games
Basketball players at the 2002 Asian Games
Women's Korean Basketball League players
South Korean women's basketball coaches
Asian Games gold medalists for South Korea
Asian Games silver medalists for South Korea
Asian Games bronze medalists for South Korea
South Korean expatriate basketball people
South Korean expatriate sportspeople in China
Expatriate basketball people in China
Medalists at the 1994 Asian Games
Medalists at the 1998 Asian Games
Medalists at the 2002 Asian Games
Olympic coaches